Gunta Baško (formerly known also as Gunta Baško-Melnbārde; born 27 April 1980) is a Latvian women's basketball player currently playing for TTT Riga and Latvia women's national basketball team.

Baško first played in a professional team in 1995. After three years with the local RTU/Klondaika Rīga team Baško moved to Siena Saints of NCAA. In 2003, she moved to Israel, then spent four years in France and is currently a member of Wisła Can Pack Kraków team.

At age 19, she already represented Latvia at EuroBasket Women 1999. She was one of the youngest players in the tournament. Baško also contributed to the successes of the team in EuroBaskets 2005 and 2007.

Siena statistics
Source

Private life
In August 2011 Gunta Baško married ex-basketball player Kristaps Melnbārdis, and changed surname form Baško to Baško-Melnbārde. In February 2018 the couple divorced.

References

External links
 
 
 
 
 
 

1980 births
Living people
Basketball players at the 2008 Summer Olympics
Basketball players from Riga
Latvian expatriate basketball people in France
Latvian expatriate basketball people in Italy
Latvian expatriate basketball people in Russia
Forwards (basketball)
Latvian expatriate basketball people in Poland
Latvian expatriate basketball people in Spain
Latvian expatriate basketball people in the United States
Latvian women's basketball players
Olympic basketball players of Latvia
People from Olaine
Siena Saints women's basketball players
Tarbes Gespe Bigorre players